New Year's glasses are novelty eyeglasses in the numerical shape of the coming year usually worn during New Year's Eve parties. They were invented and patented  by Richard Sclafani and Peter Cicero in 1992, although other companies have produced similar versions. New Year's glasses' inspiration and popularity arose from the fact that the two digits in the middle of the year number (9 and 0 from the years 1990-2009) had holes suitable for looking through or mounting lenses into.

Availability

New Year's Glasses are often sold at New Year's Eve events and parties. Street vendors in NYC are known to sell the glasses with extremely high markups. In 2015, the average cost of glasses in Times Square was upwards of $25.

References

American inventions
Eyewear
1990s fashion
2000s fashion
Party equipment
1990 introductions